Haplochromis paraplagiostoma was a species of cichlid endemic to Lake Victoria.  This species could reach a length of  SL. The species is now presumed extinct

References

paraplagiostoma
Fish described in 1969
Taxonomy articles created by Polbot